Philip Vernon le Geyt Falle  (19 March 1885 – 2 January 1936) was a Jersey sailor who represented Great Britain at the 1928 Summer Olympics in Amsterdam, Netherlands.

He was born in British India and grew up in Saint Helier, Jersey. He was educated at Reading School in Berkshire. During World War I, he served in the Army Service Corps and was awarded the Distinguished Service Order in the 1916 Birthday Honours.

References

British male sailors (sport)
Sailors at the 1928 Summer Olympics – 8 Metre
Olympic sailors of Great Britain
1885 births
1936 deaths
People from Saint Helier
Companions of the Distinguished Service Order
Jersey male sailors (sport)
Jersey military personnel